Carolina Theater was a historic movie theater located at Fayetteville, Cumberland County, North Carolina.  It was built in 1927, and was an oversize two-story brick rectangular building in the Moorish Revival style. The front facade featured terra cotta, clay, brickwork, and decorative stone or concrete friezework. The theater closed on October 19, 1978. It has been demolished.

It was listed on the National Register of Historic Places in 1983.

References

External links
Cinema Treasures: Carolina Theater

Theatres on the National Register of Historic Places in North Carolina
Moorish Revival architecture in the United States
Theatres completed in 1927
Buildings and structures in Fayetteville, North Carolina
National Register of Historic Places in Cumberland County, North Carolina